D. Sreedevi (28 April 1939 – 5 March 2018). was an Indian lawyer, court justice and social activist in Kerala  She was the Chairperson of Kerala State Women's Commission twice.

Early life and education

D Sreedevi was born in 1939 at Chirayankeezhu in Thiruvananthapuram District of Kerala as the daughter of Damodaran and Janaki Amma. Both were teachers. She did her pre-graduation in NSS College, Thiruvananthapuram and graduation in Sree Narayana College, Kollam. She obtained her B.L. from Government Law College, Thiruvananthapuram.

Career

Sreedevi was enrolled as Advocate and began her practice in Thiruvananthapuram in 1962. She began her career in the lower judiciary in Kerala. In 1971 she was appointed the Munsiff at Kottarakkara in the Kerala Sub-ordinate Judicial Services. She was promoted as District & Sessions Judge in 1984. She was then elevated to the High Court of Kerala as a Judge on 14 January 1997.  She retired as the Judge of the High Court on 28 April 2001.

Chairperson of Kerala Women's Commission

She later went on to become the Chairperson of Kerala Women's Commission on 21 March 2001 and continued until 12 May 2002 with T. Devi, Adv. Nafeesath Beevi, Adv. K. Santhakumari, Smt. P. K. Sainaba, Prof. P. Gowri and Prof. Monamma Kokkad as the members of the commission. She once again became the Chairperson of the commission for a term of 5 years from 2 March 2007 to 1 March 2012 with T. Devi, P.K.Sainaba, Rugmini Bhaskaran, Prof. Meenakshi Thampan (02-03-2007 to 15-07-2011) and Adv. Noorbeena Rasheed (16-08-2011 to 01-03-2012) as members.

According to the present Women's commission chairperson M. C. Josephine, Justice Sreedevi's legal expertise was instrumental in ensuring justice to women in distress and her efforts are a model for others in women empowerment (Times of India, March 5, 2018).

Family
Sreedevi was married to U Balaji, who was a well known advocate. Her son Basant Balaji is also an advocate and served as Government Pleader.

Autobiography

Sreedevi's autobiography is titled ‘Aajanma Niyogam’ which means  a lifelong mission.

Awards

 The Akkamma Cheriyan Award for the best social worker (2009).
 The Guruvandanam award instituted by Asan Institute.
 The P N Panickar Family Welfare Award

Death
Sreedevi died suddenly on 5 March 2018 from liver failure. She was 78. She was under treatment for liver disease in her last days.

References 

Scholars from Thiruvananthapuram
1939 births
2018 deaths
Indian women activists
Activists from Kerala
20th-century Indian judges
21st-century Indian judges
Women educators from Kerala
Educators from Kerala
20th-century Indian women judges
21st-century Indian women lawyers
21st-century Indian lawyers
Deaths from liver failure